Fury from the Deep is the completely missing sixth serial of the fifth season in the British science fiction television series Doctor Who, which originally aired in six weekly parts from 16 March to 20 April 1968.

In this serial, the Doctor (Patrick Troughton) and his travelling companions Jamie McCrimmon (Frazer Hines) and Victoria Waterfield (Deborah Watling) find themselves at a Euro Sea Gas refinery off the coast of contemporary England, where an infectious weed spreads rapidly, infecting and mind controlling anyone who comes into contact with it, including the refinery leader Robson (Victor Maddern). This story is the last to feature Watling as Victoria Waterfield. It also marks the first appearance of the Doctor's gadget, the sonic screwdriver.

Although audio recordings, still photographs, and clips of the story exist, no episodes of this serial are known to have survived. Chronologically, it is the most recent story to be completely missing from the BBC Archives. BBC Studios released an animated version of the serial using the surviving audio in September 2020, animated by Big Finish Creative.

Plot
When the TARDIS lands in the sea off the eastern coast of England, the Second Doctor, Jamie and Victoria investigate a nearby beach, which seems to have an improbably large amount of sea foam as well as a major gas pipe marked "Euro Sea Gas". When the Doctor examines the pipe using a sonic screwdriver, he thinks he hears a heartbeat from within. The trio are captured and put in a cell by Robson, a ruthless gas refiner who heads a pumping operation with a network of rigs spanning the North Sea.  His second-in-command is Harris, a scientist. Robson is unnerved by the loss of contact with gas drilling Rig D at sea, plus an unexplained drop in the feed line from the rigs. The Doctor suggests that the supposed heartbeat could be a creature inside the pipe and suggests that the gas flow be suspended while he investigates, but Robson refuses to do so, and has Harris lock up the travellers.

Harris believes Robson's pride is making him refuse to shut off the gas flow in order to properly investigate the feed lines, but his calculations are mysteriously gone from his briefcase. Thinking he has left the file in his desk at home, he asks his wife to look for it and bring it to him. The file is on the desk, but when she opens it, Mrs. Harris is pricked by a sharp piece of seaweed. She falls ill, and Harris ends up asking the Doctor for assistance after Victoria has helped the travellers escape from their cell by picking the lock with her hairpin. Meanwhile, Mrs. Harris is visited by Mr. Oak and Mr. Quill, technicians from the command centre who have already been infected by the seaweed, and have long green tendrils growing along their arms and backs of their hands. The men render Mrs. Harris unconscious by attacking her with noxious gas from their mouths, then leave. Arriving after, the Doctor can't determine what's wrong with Mrs. Harris, but his suspicions are aroused by the seaweed, and he, Jamie and Victoria return to the TARDIS to study it. 

The Doctor experiments on the seaweed, which when returned to water grows in size and strength, and seems to become malevolent before they successfully seal it in its aquarium. Meanwhile, Robson and Harris continue to antagonize one another, Robson becoming more and more strident and emotional. Exhausted, he retires to his room to rest, and is locked inside by Mr. Oak. As the heartbeat noise fills the cabin, sea foam gushes from the air vent, and Robson wakes to see a creature behind the vent trying to get through. The Doctor, already on his way to see Robson, is alarmed by Robson's screams and forces the door. Robson flees in terror and the Doctor and Harris get a glimpse of the creature before it goes back inside the vent.

With Robson disappeared and now aware of the real threat, Harris assumes control of the command centre, calling in Megan Jones, Director of Euro Gas. The Doctor and his friends return to Harris's home, and find Mrs. Harris gone but the house filling up with sea foam, which they barely escape from through a skylight. They return to the centre and find Mrs. Harris hasn't been seen there either; despite his duties, Harris feels he must search for his wife, and leaves the chief engineer in charge. Out on the beach Mrs. Harris and Robson are watching the waves, and she tells him there isn't much time and he knows what he must do. Robson agrees, and Mrs. Harris walks out into the waves. Harris appears and questions Robson, who calmly tells him he'll see his wife soon, and then walks away down the beach.

As Megan Jones is about to arrive, Harris returns to the centre and informs her of the situation, but she doesn't believe him. He also prioritises the capture of Robson, who is found sedated in his room, and Megan Jones demands to see him. He has sunk into a depressed state but briefly rallies and begs his old friend to help him. They leave him and he rests. On awakening, the heartbeat sound returns to his head, and he heads off. Within minutes, he finds Victoria and takes her hostage. He forces her into a helicopter and flies it out to sea. Now terrified, Megan Jones tells the Doctor to do whatever he can. The seaweed has pumped itself up into the impeller pipe in the impeller room and is soon expanding and throbbing. It bursts the pipe and starts to fill the rooms. The Doctor commandeers a helicopter and travels with Jamie to the rig where Victoria has been taken, where they find Robson mostly transformed into a seaweed creature. He says humanity is doomed and tries to gas the Doctor with his breath. Jamie has meanwhile found Victoria. When she sees Robson's form she starts screaming, which appears to distress and disable Robson, and they all escape.

Back at the command centre, the Doctor realises that the sea creatures are sensitive to high-pitched sounds, and he rigs up the centre's equipment to loop and amplify a recording of Victoria's screams into the pipes which lead to the central rig. The creatures invading the command centre through the impeller are also destroyed this way, using hand-held speakers. Through the video link, it is clear the foam has dissipated and all of the humans have returned to normal, including Robson and Mrs. Harris.

Victoria, mentally and emotionally exhausted, and frustrated that everywhere they go together is always dangerous and she's always afraid, decides to leave the TARDIS crew. The Harrises welcome her to their home and though the Doctor accepts this, Jamie is heartbroken. The Doctor and Jamie stay another day to check that she is sure about her decision, and then depart in the TARDIS after Victoria and Jamie say farewell to each other, leaving Victoria watching them from the beach.

Production

 Episode is missing

Working titles for this story included The Colony of Devils. The footage of the TARDIS landing in the sea in episode 1 is later reused in episode 10 of The War Games in the next season.

This story marked the switch from 35 mm film to 16 mm film for its location filming. This film stock would be used until 1985's Revelation of the Daleks, though 35mm would still be used for model and effects shots.

Missing episodes
None of the six episodes of this serial are known to exist in full or known to have survived in the BBC Archives (see Doctor Who missing episodes). The master videotapes for the story were the final 1960s Doctor Who episodes to be erased; they were authorised for wiping in late 1974.
This is the latest chronological Doctor Who story of which all episodes are missing from the archives. A few seconds of the start of episode 1 (the TARDIS descending vertically to land on the sea) survives due to it being used a year later in episode 10 of The War Games, as do the scenes where Oak and Quill launch their toxic gas attack in episode 2, the Weed attacking Van Lutyens in episode 4, the Doctor and Jamie approaching the foam in episode 4, and brief clips from episode 5, both focusing on the character Robson attacking a guard and piloting a helicopter with a dazed Victoria as his prisoner. This material only survives because they were cut from Australian broadcasts by the censors, and were never returned to the BBC. Fury from the Deep aired in Melbourne Australia when the Gas and Fuel Corporation were converting homes from town gas to natural gas, which may have contributed to these edits (especially as the Oak and Quill sequence mirrored the need for technicians to enter homes).

Behind-the-scenes 8mm footage in colour and raw film trims during the climactic battle sequence both survive from episode 6, giving an important insight on what the production looked like when it was filmed decades ago.

Cast notes
Roy Spencer had previously played Manyak in The Ark (1966). Hubert Rees later played Captain Ransom in The War Games (1969) and John Stevenson in The Seeds of Doom (1976). June Murphy later played 3rd Officer Jane Blythe in The Sea Devils (1972). John Abineri later played General Carrington in The Ambassadors of Death (1970), Richard Railton in Death to the Daleks (1974), and Ranquin in The Power of Kroll (1979). Margaret John later played Grandma in "The Idiot's Lantern" (2006). Graham Leaman appeared previously as the Controller in The Macra Terror (1967) and later as a Time Lord in The Three Doctors (1973).

Commercial releases

In print

A novelisation of this serial, written by the series scriptwriter Victor Pemberton, was published by Target Books in May 1986. The cover advertised the volume as a special "bumper" edition, referring to its increased length in comparison to other Target novelisations and as explanation of the consequently higher retail price.

Home media
The visual material that has remained (short clips from episodes 1, 2, 4 and 5, behind-the-scenes 8mm colour film, and raw film trims from the recording of episode 6) was released on VHS as part of the "Missing Years" documentary. They also appeared on DVD as part of the Lost in Time boxset. A fan-made documentary entitled The Making of Fury from the Deep was released in 1999 as part of a telesnap reconstruction of the story. Edited by Richard Bignell, it lasts fifty minutes and includes interviews with key members of the production team.

The audio soundtracks have been released commercially. In 1993, an abridged audio cassette version was released featuring linking narration by Tom Baker in character as the Fourth Doctor, reminiscing about the incident. In 2004, a newly remastered CD version was released with linking narration by Frazer Hines. The unabridged novelisation reading by David Troughton was released by AUDIOGO on 7 July 2011. The reading, complete with new music and sound effects, is presented over six discs, and is available for digital download from AUDIOGO.

On 27 October 2019, BBC Studios announced that Fury from the Deep would be released on DVD and Blu-ray in 2020 with all 6 episodes animated. This animated reconstruction of the serial was released on 14 September 2020.  Also included as a bonus feature is The Slide, a 7-part radio drama also by Pemberton that served as the basis for Fury'''s creation. The Slide was also an adaptation of a Doctor Who'' script by Pemberton for the First Doctor that went unproduced.

Theatre 
In 2002, Bedlam Theatre Company presented a BBC approved adaptation at the New Theatre Royal, Portsmouth. The show's director and adapter Rob Thrush invited writer Victor Pemberton to advise on the show and approve script changes. Ultimately Pemberton attended rehearsals and the opening night, appearing on local TV to promote the show and share memories of the original production.

References

External links

 
 Photonovel of Fury from the Deep on the BBC website
 Doctor Who Locations – Fury from the Deep

Target novelisation
 

Doctor Who missing episodes
Doctor Who serials novelised by Victor Pemberton
Doctor Who stories set on Earth
Second Doctor serials
1968 British television episodes
Television episodes set in England